Ghost Team One is a 2013 independent comedy horror film directed by Scott Rutherford and Ben Peyser, and starring Carlos Santos and J. R. Villarreal as two roommates who try to prove their house is haunted in order to impress a beautiful girl played by Fernanda Romero. The film premiered at the 2013 Slamdance Film Festival and was released in theaters on October 11, 2013.

Characters
Carlos Santos as Sergio
J. R. Villarreal as Brad
Fernanda Romero as Fernanda
Tony Cavalero as Chuck

Reception
Ghost Team One was released theatrically nationwide by Paramount Studios on October 11, 2013. The film received mixed reviews, with a 36% approval rating on Rotten Tomatoes. Andy Webster of The New York Times credited the success of the film to "...the improvisational energy of Mr. Santos and Mr. Villarreal, whose ease, chemistry and humor never flag".

Jeff Shannon of The Seattle Times wrote "Destined to be a streaming-video hit with truant frat boys everywhere".

Rob Staeger of The Village Voice commented "Thanks to the shakiest of shaky-cams, you don't know whether to wince or lose your lunch".

According to Inkoo Kang of the Los Angeles Times, "The scariest thing about Ghost Team One is the horror-comedy's blatant racial minstrelsy".

Writing for The Philadelphia Inquirer, Tirdad Derakhshani called a film "A terrible yet lovable take on the haunted-house yarn".

References

External links

American independent films
2013 comedy horror films
American fantasy comedy films
Films about size change
Direct-to-video sequel films
American comedy horror films
Parodies of horror
2013 comedy films
2010s English-language films
2013 independent films
2010s American films